Harry A. Keplinger House is a historic home located at Fort Wayne, Indiana. It was built about 1893, and is a -story, Richardsonian Romanesque style brick dwelling with a rock-faced stone foundation.  It features a steeply pitched roof and dormers, round two-story towers at each of the front corners with conical roofs, and a one-story front porch connecting the two towers. It was built by Harry A. Keplinger, a prominent turn-of-the-20th century businessman.

It was listed on the National Register of Historic Places in 1983.

References

Houses on the National Register of Historic Places in Indiana
Houses completed in 1893
Richardsonian Romanesque architecture in Indiana
National Register of Historic Places in Fort Wayne, Indiana
Houses in Fort Wayne, Indiana